Efigênia Mariquinhas dos Santos Lima Clemente is a member of the Pan-African Parliament from Angola, beginning in 2004.

See also
 List of members of the Pan-African Parliament

References

Year of birth missing (living people)
Living people
21st-century Angolan women politicians
21st-century Angolan politicians
Members of the Pan-African Parliament from Angola
Women members of the Pan-African Parliament